The Old Jail, also known as the Gordo Jail and Mayor's Office, is a historic former jail and office building in Gordo, Pickens County, Alabama.  The two-story brick structure was completed in 1914.  It originally contained two jail cells and a mayor's office downstairs, with a courtroom upstairs.  It served as jail and town hall until circa 1930, when everything but the jail moved to other premises.  It continued to serve as a jail until 1955.  It has served various functions since that time.  It was added to the National Register of Historic Places on December 17, 1974.

References

National Register of Historic Places in Pickens County, Alabama
Jails on the National Register of Historic Places in Alabama
Buildings and structures in Pickens County, Alabama
Government buildings completed in 1914
Defunct prisons in Alabama
Jails in Alabama
1914 establishments in Alabama